Melody of the Heart is a 1929 German musical film directed by Hanns Schwarz and starring Dita Parlo, Willy Fritsch and Gerő Mály.

The film was the first successful sound film produced by the German major studio Universum Film AG (Ufa) and was credited with establishing the popularity of the operetta film. It was shot in Hungary. Initially the film was intended to be silent, but halfway through production its producer Erich Pommer was ordered by his superiors to convert it into a sound film.

Ufa had recently made a deal with the Klangfilm syndicate (consisting of Siemens & Halske, AEG, and Polyphon-Werke AG (who sold Polydor records) to license the Tri-Ergon sound film system, under the name 'Ufa-Klang'. A previous attempt in 1925 by Ufa to use an earlier version of the same system, at the time owned by Klangfilm's former competitor, Tobis, had ended in failure.

The film premiered at the Ufa-Palast am Zoo in Berlin on 16 December 1929. It was released in four different languages: German, English, French and Hungarian. Such multiple-language versions, which had been pioneered by British International Pictures, were popular in Europe until dubbing became more widespread.

Cast
 Dita Parlo as Julia Balog
 Willy Fritsch as János Garas
 Gerő Mály as Vater Garas
 Marcsa Simon as Mutter Garas
 János Körmendy as Vater Kovács
 Juliska Ligeti as Mutter Kovács
 Anni Mewes as Anna Kovács
 Tomy Endrey as Der kleine Kovács
 Ilka Grüning as Fräulein Czibulka
 László Dezsõffy as Zugführer Benézel

References

Bibliography
 Bergfelder, Tim & Bock, Hans-Michael. The Concise Cinegraph: Encyclopedia of German Cinema. Berghahn Books, 2009.
 
 
 Hardt, Ursula. From Caligari to California: Erich Pommer's Life in the International Film Wars. Berghahn Books, 1996.
 Kreimeier, Klaus. The Ufa Story: A History of Germany's Greatest Film Company, 1918-1945. University of California Press, 1999.
 Rogowski, Christian. The Many Faces of Weimar Cinema: Rediscovering Germany's Filmic Legacy. Camden House, 2010.

External links

1929 films
1929 musical films
German musical films
Films of the Weimar Republic
1920s German-language films
Films directed by Hanns Schwarz
Films set in Hungary
Films set in the 1900s
German multilingual films
Films about prostitution
Transitional sound films
Films shot in Hungary
UFA GmbH films
Prostitution in Hungary
German black-and-white films
Films produced by Erich Pommer
Films with screenplays by Hans Székely
1920s multilingual films
1920s German films